Duce Robinson is an American football tight end.

Early life and high school
Robinson initially grew up in Dallas, Texas. His family moved to  Phoenix, Arizona and he enrolled at Pinnacle High School. Robinson received his first college football scholarship offer from Arizona State after taking part in a 7-on-7 tournament, despite not yet having played in a single tackle football game. He is also a starter on Pinnacle's basketball team. Robinson had 60 catches for 972 yards and eight touchdowns as a junior. He is rated 5-star recruit and is the consensus top tight end prospect for the 2023 recruiting class. Robinson caught 84 passes for 1,614 yards and 14 touchdowns as a senior and played in the Under Armour All-America Game.

Robinson is also considered a top baseball prospect for the 2023 class.

Personal life
Robinson's father, Dominic Robinson, played both baseball and football at Florida State University. His mother was a swimmer at the University of Florida.

References

Living people
Players of American football from Arizona
American football tight ends
Year of birth missing (living people)